Pilot Township is one of fifteen townships in Surry County, North Carolina, United States. The township had a population of 3,532 according to the 2000 census.

Geographically, Pilot Township occupies  in eastern Surry County. The only incorporated municipality within Pilot Township is the Town of Pilot Mountain. Pilot Township is named for the landmark peak of Pilot Mountain

Townships in Surry County, North Carolina
Townships in North Carolina